Trnava is a village located in the Užice municipality of Serbia.

References

Užice
Populated places in Zlatibor District